The 2012 Trading Post Perth Challenge was a motor racing event for the Australian sedan-based V8 Supercars. It was the fourth event of the 2012 International V8 Supercars Championship, featuring Races 7, 8 & 9. The unusual three race format is a staple of the Barbagallo Raceway event, in part caused by the different time zone of Western Australia compared to eastern states. It was held on the weekend of 4–6 May at the Barbagallo Raceway, in Perth, Western Australia. It was also the first time the series utilised the new pitlane on the infield of the circuit as opposed to the original one on the outside of the circuit.

The meeting saw a clean sweep of race wins by the Ford Performance Racing team. Mark Winterbottom won Saturday's Race 5 of the championship, while Sunday's two races were both won by Will Davison, the third and final race saw Davison on tyres no longer capable of sustaining front running speed being caught rapidly by Winterbottom and Jamie Whincup of the Triple Eight Race Engineering team. Davison won as his team-mate Winterbottom snuck past Whincup on the last lap to defuse the hostile challenge from the Holden driver.

Standings
 After 9 of 30 races.

References

Perth V8 400
Perth V8 400
Sport in Perth, Western Australia
Motorsport in Western Australia